Transformers: Last Bot Standing is an American comic book limited series written by Nick Roche, drawn by Roche and E. J. Su, and colored by Rebecca Nalty and Brittany Peer, and was published by IDW Publishing in 2022.

Based on the Transformers franchise by Hasbro and Takara-Tomy, the series is one of the last projects presented by IDW before the publisher passes the Transformers comic book license back to Hasbro at the end of the 2022.

The series debuted on May 11, 2022, and concluded on August 31, 2022.

Premise 
In a distant future, the war between Autobots and Decepticons on Cybertron is over, but all Transformers are nearly extinct. Rodimus is the last surviving Cybertronian, and is haunted by the sins of its species. He spends his final days in Donnokt, a planet on the verge of collapse after industrialisation.

Publication history 
Transformers: Last Bot Standing was announced in February 2022, written by Nick Roche (writer of The Transformers: Last Stand of the Wreckers, Transformers: Sins of the Wreckers and Transformers: Requiem of the Wreckers), drawn by E. J. Su (artist of The Transformers: Infiltration, The Transformers: Escalation, The Transformers: Devastation and The Transformers: Revelation), and colored by Rebecca Nalty, released in May 2022 by IDW Publishing.

The series is one of the last projects presented by IDW before the publisher passes the Transformers comic book license back to Hasbro at the end of 2022.

Roche said, “the last remaining Cybertronian, stalked by the sins of their entire race, must save the world one final time. In a way, Last Bot Standing is a proper farewell, as our creative team bows out of IDW’s Transformers universe in the most explosive and apocalyptic way imaginable. To have E.J. Su, the visual architect of IDW’s definitive Transformers run, be the one to depict ‘The End of All Things’ (with colors from the astounding Rebecca Nalty) is the most perfect and bittersweet piece of artistic casting I could think of.”

Su said, “the Transformers franchise has come a long way since we laid our eyes on the first episode of the cartoon, and it’s amazing how many writers can put so many different spins on the core characters. Nick has masterfully crafted some of the most memorable Transformers comic stories, and this one will be no exception as the readers weave their way through the mystery and find out how our beloved characters came to this situation. We hope that they enjoy it as much as we have enjoyed making it.”

IDW editor David Mariotte said, “like Teenage Mutant Ninja Turtles: The Last Ronin, Last Bot Standing is one of those great stories where defining creators come together to tell one incredible version of an ending, a hypothetical last story for our beloved heroes and villains. We’re so excited to have two of the first IDW Transformers creators return to tell a story unlike literally any Transformers story you’ve ever seen or we’ve ever done.”

Issues

Reception

Collected editions

References 

IDW Publishing titles
2022 comics debuts
Transformers comics
2022 comics endings